The Dittert conjecture, or Dittert–Hajek conjecture, is a mathematical hypothesis (in combinatorics) concerning the maximum achieved by a particular function  of matrices with real, nonnegative entries satisfying a summation condition. The conjecture is due to Eric Dittert and (independently) Bruce Hajek.

References

Conjectures
Combinatorics
Inequalities